Pakbirra Jain temples is a group of three Jain temples in Pakbirra village in Purulia district of West Bengal.

History 
Purulia was an important Jain center from 6th to 13th century.

Architecture 
The temple complex consist of three stone temples, the smallest in eastern side and two in the north. These temples are built in triratha nagara style. There are fragments of large amalaka, and the stone kalasha with lotus buds. The principal temple is large and contains preliminary chambers and sanctum. The temple in west, enshrined the  colossal idol of a Padmaprabha with lotus emblem stamped on pedestal. The temple also has sculptures of eight tirthankaras, including three idols of Rishabhanatha, two of Mahavira, Sambhavanatha, Padmaprabha, Chandraprabha in kayotsarga posture and idols of two Yaksha and Yakshi beneath a tree with an image of Jina on top. Three ayagapata or votive stupas and an idol of Ambika standing beneath a flowering tree with her children and an attendant with lion as her vehicle. The temple also enshrines  with 360 Jina figurine.

Pakbirra Jain complex also has an open-air museum with sculptures of Jain deities.

Gallery

References

Citation

Sources

Book

Web

External links 
 

Jain temples in West Bengal
9th-century Jain temples
Purulia district